The 1902 Alabama gubernatorial election took place on November 2, 1902, in order to elect the governor of Alabama. It was the first Alabama gubernatorial election in which the governor was elected for a four-year term; prior to 1902 the governor was elected to a two-year term. Incumbent Democrat William D. Jelks was running for election to his first full term; he had succeeded William J. Samford upon Samford's death a year prior. His Republican opponent, John A. W. Smith, was the son of former Alabama governor William Hugh Smith.

Results

References

1902
gubernatorial
Alabama
November 1902 events